Sir John Baldwin (died 24 October 1545) was an English lawyer and Chief Justice of the Common Pleas.

Family
According to Baker, John Baldwin, born 11 August 1470, was a younger son of William Baldwin (died c.1479) of Aylesbury, Buckinghamshire, and Agnes Dormer, the daughter of William Dormer of West Wycombe, Buckinghamshire. However, according to The Visitation of Buckinghamshire and other sources, Agnes Dormer, the daughter of William Dormer (d.1506) of West Wycombe, was John Baldwin's first wife, not his mother.

Baldwin is said to have had an elder brother, Richard Baldwin (d.1484).

Baldwin's uncle, also named John Baldwin (d. 1469), had a legal career in London as a bencher of Gray's Inn and common serjeant of the city. At his death in 1469 his estates in Aylesbury were inherited in turn by Baldwin's father, William, by Baldwin's elder brother, Richard (d.1484), and in 1484 by Baldwin himself.

According to Testamenta Vetusta: Being Illustrations from Wills, of Manners, Customs, &c. As Well As of theDescents and Possessions of Many Distinguished Families. Volume 2 By Nicholas Harris Nicholas, Esq. In the will of William Dormer, his daughter Agnes is married to William Baldwin

Career
Details of John Baldwin's early legal career are sparse. He joined the Inner Temple at some time before 1500, and was practicing in the Court of Requests by 1506. He was appointed a justice of the peace for Buckinghamshire in 1510. He gave his first reading at the Inner Temple in 1516, and served as treasurer from 1521 to 1523.

In 1529 Baldwin was returned to Parliament for Hindon, and in 1530 was appointed Attorney General for Wales and the Duchy of Lancaster.

He gave a third reading at the Inner Temple in 1531, and was appointed a Serjeant-at-law and King's Serjeant in the same year. In 1534 he was knighted, which Sir John Spelman considered 'unprecedented' for a serjeant.

Further details of Baldwin's judicial career can be gleaned from the reports of Sir James Dyer, whose opinion of Baldwin was not always complimentary. In June 1535 Baldwin was required to pass sentence of treason on the Carthusian priors, as the remaining justices had departed before the verdict was rendered. Then, in later life Baldwin added to his landed estates. In 1536 he purchased a country home at Little Marlow, and in 1540 the site of the former Greyfriars monastery in Aylesbury. In 1538 Baldwin was involved, through no fault of his own, in a miscarriage of justice at the assizes at Bury, when a man was convicted of murder on the evidence of his young son, and after his execution it was discovered that the alleged victim was still alive.

Baldwin was a circuit judge in Norfolk until 1541, and then served on the home circuit. After the death of Sir Robert Norwich, he was appointed Chief Justice of the Common Pleas on 19 April 1535, and served in that capacity until his death.

He died 24 October 1545, and was buried in Aylesbury Church.

Marriages and issue
According to Baker, although the identity of Baldwin's first wife is 'uncertain', her first name was probably Agnes, and she was the mother of Baldwin's son, William, and three daughters, Agnes, Pernell and Alice: However, as noted above, according to other sources, Baldwin's first wife was Agnes Dormer, the daughter of William Dormer (d.1506) of West Wycombe, and the sister of Sir Robert Dormer (d. 1552).

William Baldwin (d.1538), was a lawyer of the Inner Temple. He married Mary Tyringham, the daughter of Thomas Tyringham (d. 28 September 1526) of Tyringham, Buckinghamshire, by Anne Catesby, daughter of Sir Humphrey Catesby of Whiston, Northamptonshire, but predeceased his father, leaving no issue.
Agnes Baldwin married Robert Pakington (d.1536). Their son, Sir Thomas Pakington (died 2 June 1571), was one of Baldwin's heirs.
Pernell Baldwin married firstly Thomas Ramsey of Hitcham, Buckinghamshire, by whom she had a daughter, Elizabeth Ramsey, and secondly Edward Borlase (d.1544), Citizen and Mercer of London. Their eldest son, John Borlase (c.1528 – 6 May 1593), esquire, was one of Baldwin's heirs, and was bequeathed all Baldwin's law books. He married Anne Lytton, the daughter of Sir Robert Lytton (d.1550) of Knebworth. After the death of his first wife, Pernell Baldwin, Edward Borlase married Joan Dormer, the daughter of Sir Michael Dormer.
Alice Baldwin was the last abbess of Burnham Abbey. She survived her father by only a few months, and in her will made provision for the erection of a marble tomb with depictions of her parents and their children.
 
In 1518 Baldwin married Anne (née Norris), widow of William Wroughton (d. before 1515), and daughter of Sir William Norris (d.1507) of Yattendon, Berkshire, by his third wife, Anne Horne. She is said to have become insane before Baldwin's death, and in October 1545 Edward Seymour, Earl of Hertford, suggested that she be placed in the care of her son by her first marriage, Sir William Wroughton (d. 4 September 1559). Three months later Anne was sent to live with her kinswoman, Mary (née Norris) Carew (d.1570), widow of Vice-Admiral Sir George Carew (c.1504 – 19 July 1545), and daughter of Henry Norris (b. before 1500, d. 1536) of Bray, Berkshire, and his wife, Mary. The date of Anne's death is not known.

Notes

References

External links
Will of Sir John Baldwin, Chief Justice of the Common Pleas of Aylesbury, Buckinghamshire, proved 27 October 1545, National Archives Retrieved 29 April 2013
Will of Alice Baldwin of Aylesbury, Buckinghamshire, proved 2 March 1546, National Archives Retrieved 29 April 2013
Will of William Dormer of West Wycombe, Buckinghamshire, proved 7 October 1506, PROB 11/15/245, National Archives Retrieved 11 May 2013
Will of Edward Borlase, Mercer of London, proved 16 June 1544, PROB 11/30/136, National Archives Retrieved 12 May 2013
Will of William Baldwin, proved 24 April 1539, PROB 11/27/450, National Archives Retrieved 12 May 2003

Chief Justices of the Common Pleas
Knights Bachelor
Serjeants-at-law (England)
1545 deaths
English MPs 1529–1536
Year of birth missing
16th-century English judges